Brian Wong is a Canadian entrepreneur.

Brian Wong may also refer to:

Brian Wong (racing driver) (born 1989), American racing driver
Brian Wong (politician), Canadian provincial politician

See also
Bryan Wong (born 1971), Singaporean actor